The Brit Award for International Song is an award given by the British Phonographic Industry (BPI), an organisation which represents record companies and artists in the United Kingdom. The accolade is presented at the Brit Awards, an annual celebration of British and international music. The winners and nominees are determined by the Brit Awards voting academy with over one thousand members, which comprise record labels, publishers, managers, agents, media, and previous winners and nominees. The inaugural winner of the category was Olivia Rodrigo.

History
The category was introduced in 2022 following a restructuring which resulted in the removal of gendered categories. It is the first award to recognise individual songs by international artists and only the second category, following the Brit Award for International Album (1977, 2002-2011), to honor the work of international artists rather than the artists themselves.

Winners and nominees

See also
Brit Award for British Single

References

Brit Awards
Awards established in 2022